Epiperipatus vagans is a species of velvet worm in the Peripatidae family. The male of this species has 29 or 30 pairs of legs; females have 32 or 33. The type locality is in Panama.

References

Onychophorans of tropical America
Onychophoran species
Animals described in 1925